"The Everlasting Gaze" is a song written by Billy Corgan and recorded by the Smashing Pumpkins. It is the opening track from the band's 2000 album Machina/The Machines of God. The song was released as the lead North American single on December 9, 1999. It was also originally going to be released internationally in January 2000 but despite the heavy rotation of the Jonas Åkerlund-directed music video, it was rejected in favor of "Stand Inside Your Love".

Song information 
The unique guitar sound in the song was achieved by using a small Crate practice amp. Corgan has said that this song "has a lot to do with spirituality and trying to find my place in the universe and sort of humbly accepting limitations and the things I've been graced with. It's more of a humanistic world view. I'm not writing anymore for the tortured teen—both me and whoever was listening. I'm writing with the idea that everybody's experiencing these things all the time, and even if they're not experiencing them personally, they're affected by them. You can live in the street and write about the garbage, or you can try to get up a little higher and look down and try to see the bigger picture."

During the recording of Machina/The Machines of God, an early version of this song with very different lyrics had the working title of "Disco King". The final version of the song retains Chamberlin's consistent use of offbeat hi-hat beats. The final chorus was cut from the final version, though an a cappella section was added.

Music video 
The music video was directed by Jonas Åkerlund and is a performance-based music video, the first to feature Melissa Auf der Maur, playing bass with the band after the departure of D'arcy Wretzky. Originally, the band had considered Jonathan Dayton and Valerie Faris to direct the video.

Track listing 
"The Everlasting Gaze" was released with "Stand Inside Your Love" in the US as a promotional CD.

All songs written by Billy Corgan.

Charts

References

External links

 

1999 songs
1999 singles
The Smashing Pumpkins songs
Music videos directed by Jonas Åkerlund
Songs written by Billy Corgan
Song recordings produced by Flood (producer)
Song recordings produced by Billy Corgan
Virgin Records singles